William James Bradley  (12 April 1881 – 1 July 1957) was an Australian politician.

He was born in Alexandria to builder Michael Bradley and Bridget Clerkins. He attended school locally and became a clerk with the Crown Solicitors' Office from 1917 to 1918; he was also studying part-time at the University of Sydney, receiving a Bachelor of Arts in 1915 and a Bachelor of Law in 1919, in which year he was called to the bar, where he focused on commercial and industrial law. On 25 January 1922 he married Coralie Viola Moloney (née Goold). From 1912 to 1942 he served in the Australian Military Forces, in later years being part of the Army Legal Corps. King's Counsel from 1934, he was a member of Sydney City Council from 1937 to 1948. From 1940 to 1949 he was a member of the New South Wales Legislative Council, representing first the United Australia Party and then the Liberal Party. Bradley died at Lewisham in 1957.

References

1881 births
1957 deaths
United Australia Party members of the Parliament of New South Wales
Liberal Party of Australia members of the Parliament of New South Wales
Members of the New South Wales Legislative Council
Australian King's Counsel
20th-century Australian politicians